Imperatriz-Prefeito Renato Moreira Airport  is the airport serving Imperatriz, Brazil. It is named after a former mayor of Imperatriz.

It is operated by CCR.

History
Imperatriz has a long tradition of air services, which started with at the end of the 1930s with Syndicato Condor using seaplanes which landed at Tocantins River.

At the end of World War II, the first airport with a 1,200m x 30m earth runway was operational but it was subject to flooding during the rainy season. Even so, Cruzeiro do Sul, Real-Aerovias and later Varig maintained regular operations to Imperatriz.

Around the end of the 1960s studies were made for a completely new facility and the site of the present airport was chosen. The airport was commissioned in 1973 at the same time that the older facility was closed. It was administrated by Infraero between 1980 and 2021.

Previously operated by Infraero, on April 7, 2021 CCR won a 30-year concession to operate the airport.

Airlines and destinations

Accidents and incidents
18 April 1984: two VOTEC Embraer EMB 110 Bandeirante registrations PT-GJZ and PT-GKL collided on air, while on approach to land at Imperatriz. PT-GJZ was flying from São Luís to Imperatriz and crashed on ground killing all of its 18 passengers and crew. PT-GKL was flying from Belém-Val de Cans to Imperatriz and its pilot was able to make an emergency landing on Tocantins river. One passenger of its 17-passenger and crew died.

Access

See also

List of airports in Brazil

References

External links

Airports in Maranhão
1981 establishments in Brazil
Airports established in 1981